Ballyntine Cove is a former fishing and farming settlement in the Canadian province of Newfoundland and Labrador.

It was located in the Bay St. George area. Its population was 103 in 1911.

See also
List of ghost towns in Newfoundland and Labrador

Ghost towns in Newfoundland and Labrador